Yugantar Film Collective was an Indian all-female feminist film collective between 1980 and 1983.

History and work
The film collective was founded in Bangalore in 1980 by Deepa Dhanraj, Abha Bhaiya, Navroze Contractor, and Meera Rao. It was the first feminist film collective in India. 

Between 1980 and 1983, during a time of radical political transformation in India, Yugantar created four pioneering films together with existing or ensuing women's groups.

Yugantar filmed in different locations in India. They collaborated with a group of domestic workers in Pune,  documented female factory workers in Nipani, worked with Sri Shakhti Sanghatana, a feminist research and activist collective based in Hyderabad and with members of the Chipko movement.

Recognition
A retrospective of the films of Yugantar was shown at Berlinale as part of Forum Expanded in 2019.

Filmography 

 1981 Molkarin (Maid Servant); 25 min. 
 1982 Tambaku Chaakila Oob Ali (Tobacco Ember); 25 min.
 1983 Idhi Katha Matramena (Is This Just a Story?); 25 min. 
 1983 Sudesha (As Women See It); 30 min.
 1991 Something Like a War by Deepa Dhanraj; 63min.

References 

Film collectives
Indian women documentary filmmakers
Feminist organisations in India
Indian artist groups and collectives